The Treaty of Vereeniging was a peace treaty, signed on 31 May 1902, that ended the Second Boer War between the South African Republic and the Orange Free State, on the one side, and the United Kingdom on the other.

This settlement provided for the end of hostilities and eventual self-government to the Transvaal (South African Republic) and the Orange Free State as British colonies. The Boer republics agreed to come under the sovereignty of the British Crown and the British government agreed on various details.

Background
On 9 April 1902, with safe passage guaranteed by the British, the Boer leadership met at Klerksdorp, Transvaal. Present were Marthinus Steyn, Free State president and Schalk Burger acting Transvaal president with the Boer generals Louis Botha, Jan Smuts, Christiaan de Wet and Koos de la Rey and they would discuss the progress of the war and whether negotiations should be opened with the British.

On 12 April, a ten-man Boer delegation went to Melrose House in Pretoria and met General Kitchener bringing with them a seven-point proposal for a treaty of friendship. Their position was to return to a pre-war status-quo for the republics with certain changes such as a commercial union with the British colonies, votes for uitlanders, equal languages in schools and an amnesty. Kitchener was astounded but forwarded the proposal to London, knowing it would not be accepted but wanted the dialogue between the two parties to continue. Alfred Milner joined the negotiations on 14 April but he was hostile to the Boers and wanted an unconditional surrender and a free rein in administering the two republics as colonies. The British government rejected the Boers' terms and the delegation asked Kitchener for a series of armistices so that they could return and consult with the commandos as to whether they could negotiate a surrender and its terms.

On 15 May, the commandos elected 30 delegates from each pre-war republic and they met at Vereeniging. The debate was heated, split between the Transvaalers who wanted an end to the war as living conditions for the Boer civilians in the Transvaal were becoming desperate with splits developing in the Boer population there, while the Free Staters wished to continue the war.

A compromise was reached and the generals returned to Pretoria on 19 May with a proposal that the republics remain independent, with foreign relations and self-government under British control, cede control of Swaziland and relinquish control of the Witwatersrand goldfields. The terms were rejected by Kitchener and Milner with the two of them disagreeing on the direction of the future, with the former seeking reconciliation and the latter seeking humiliation. The debate between the Boer generals and British delegation would continue for days. The British made concessions which included the Cape rebels only being disenfranchised for five years. The issue of black enfranchisement was settled, when Joseph Chamberlain's argument before the war for black people's political rights to be considered at the end of the war was ignored in the interest of reconciliation, and Smuts was able to include a clause that the argument for black enfranchisement would be decided when self-government was realised for the Transvaal and Free State. As to the contentious issue of British and Boer war debt and promissory notes, Botha wanted £3 million while the British offered £1 million, with Milner angry at the idea of paying for Boer promissory notes, but Kitchener agreed seeing Botha's viewpoint that it would strengthen the latter in negotiating the terms with his delegates. The Orange River and the Transvaal colonies would first be administered by a British military administration, then by civilians and then at some point in the future via self-government.

On 27 May 1902, the British Cabinet met to discuss the final terms of the treaty and on 28 May in Pretoria, the Boers were presented with the terms and given three days to make a decision of which the answer required was either yes or no.

Sixty Boer delegates met in Vereeniging to debate the terms of the treaty and a heated debate developed between the Transvaalers and Free Staters, with Botha and Smuts arguing in favour while Marthinus Steyn argued against it. Ill, he would resign as Free State president after the first day of debate and advised Christiaan de Wet if the Transvaalers agreed to the treaty, then he should too as the Free State could not continue the war on their own.

At around 2 pm on 31 May 1902 a vote was called and 54 delegates voted yes to the terms of the treaty, only 6 voted no. On the same day the Boer leaders returned to Kitchener at Melrose House in Pretoria and the peace treaty was signed. Although the treaty is named after the town of Vereeniging in Transvaal, where the peace negotiations took place, the document was actually signed at Melrose House in Pretoria.

Terms of the settlement 
This settlement entailed the end of hostilities and the surrender of all Boer forces and their arms to the British, with the promise of eventual self-government to the Transvaal (South African Republic) and the Orange Free State as colonies of the British Empire. The Boer Republics agreed to come under the sovereignty of the British Crown and the British government agreed on various details including the following:
 All Boer fighters of both republics had to give themselves up
 All combatants would be disarmed
 Everyone had to swear allegiance to the Crown
 No death penalties would be dealt out
 A general amnesty would apply
 The use of Dutch would be allowed in the schools and law courts
 To eventually give the Transvaal and the Orange Free State self-government (civil government was granted in 1906 and 1907, respectively)
 To avoid discussing the native (Black) enfranchisement issue until self-government had been given
 To pay the Boers £3,000,000 in reconstruction aid
 Property rights of Boers would be respected
 No land taxes would be introduced
 Registered private guns would be allowed

Aftermath 

Subsequent to the British government giving the Boer colonies self-government, the Union of South Africa was created on 31 May 1910. The Union gained relative independence under the 1926 Imperial Conference and de facto independence under the 1931 Statute of Westminster. The country withdrew from the British Commonwealth and became a republic in 1961, therefore severing all political ties with Great Britain. Though still a republic, South Africa rejoined the Commonwealth in 1994.

See also 
 History of South Africa
 Military history of South Africa
 Pretoria Convention

References

Further reading
 
 Ebrahim, Hassen. The soul of a nation: Constitution-making in South Africa. (Oxford UP, 1998).
 
 Pretorius, Fransjohan. "Chapter Eight. Confronted With The Facts: Why The Boer Delegates At Vereeniging Accepted A Humiliating Peace To End The South African War, 31 May 1902." Soldiers and Settlers in Africa, 1850-1918 (Brill, 2010) pp. 195–217.
 Worsfold, W. Basil, Lord Milner's Work in South Africa, New York: E.P. Dutton, 1906

External links 

 A copy of the treaty can be found here.
 

History of Pretoria
Treaty of Vereeniging
Treaty of Vereeniging
Treaty of Vereeniging
Treaty of Vereeniging
Peace treaties of South Africa
Peace treaties of the United Kingdom
Treaties concluded in 1902
Treaties of the Orange Free State
Treaties of the South African Republic
1902 in the British Empire
Treaties of the United Kingdom (1801–1922)